The Jordan Archaeological Museum is located in the Citadel of Amman, Jordan. Built in 1951, it presents artifacts from archaeological sites in Jordan, dating from prehistoric times to the 15th century. The collections are arranged in chronological order and include items of everyday life such as flint, glass, metal and pottery objects, as well as more artistic items such as jewelry and statues. Highlights of the museum collections include some of the ʿAin Ghazal statues, which are among oldest statues ever made, and plastered human skulls from Jericho. The museum also includes a coin collection.

History
The museum was established in 1951 on top of Amman's Citadel Hill, among the remains of the Citadel in the heart of the city. 

The museum formerly housed some of the Dead Sea Scrolls, including the only Copper scroll, which are now on display in the newly established Jordan Museum, along with some of the Ain Ghazal statues.

Location

The museum is located in the Amman Citadel in Amman, one of the oldest continuously inhabited places in the world.  Two historic sites are nearby on top of the hill, the Roman Temple of Hercules that dates back to the 2nd century, and an Umayyad palace that dates back to the 8th century. Prior to 1967, the museum had a branch in East Jerusalem.

Time periods represented
The collections of the museum belong to the following periods:
 Paleolithic period: 1,000,000–10,000 years ago
 Neolithic period:
 Pre-Pottery Neolithic (PPN): 8,300–5,500 BC, the most famous artifacts that belong to this period being the Ain Ghazal statues.
 Pottery Neolithic (PN): 5,500–4,300 BC
 Chalcolithic:  4,300–3,300 BC
 Bronze Age
 Early Bronze Age: 3,300–1,900 BC
 Middle Bronze Age: 1,900–1,550 BC
 Late Bronze Age: 1,550–1,200 BC
 Iron Age: 1,200–550 BC
 Persian period: c. 550–332 BC
 Hellenistic period: c. 332–63 BC
 Nabatean period
 Roman period
 Byzantine period
 Rashidun period
 Umayyad period
 Abbasid period
 Crusader/Ayyubid period

See also
 British Museum, holding numerous findings from (Trans-)Jordan
 Israel Museum (est. 1965), holding most of the Dead Sea Scrolls
 Istanbul Archaeology Museums, holding major findings from the entire Ottoman Empire
 Jordan Museum (est. 2014), now Jordan's main archeological museum
 Louvre, holding the Mesha Stele
 National Museum of Damascus (est. 1919)
 Pergamon Museum (est. 1930), holding the Mshatta facade
 Rockefeller Archeological Museum (est. 1938), formerly the Palestine Archaeological Museum (until 1967)

References

Museums established in 1951
Archaeological museums in Jordan
1951 establishments in Jordan
Museums of Ancient Near East in Jordan
Museums in Amman